Marius Dueholm (January 5, 1881 – January 18, 1936) was an American farmer and politician.

Born in Sonberg, Denmark, Dueholm emigrated to the United States in 1890 with his family. Dueholm settled in Luck, Wisconsin, where he was a farmer. He served on the town and school boards and on the Polk County, Wisconsin Board of Supervisors. From 1931 until his death, Dueholm served in the Wisconsin State Assembly on the Wisconsin Progressive Party ticket. He died at his home in Luck, Wisconsin.

Notes

1881 births
1936 deaths
Danish emigrants to the United States
People from Luck, Wisconsin
Wisconsin Progressives (1924)
County supervisors in Wisconsin
Wisconsin city council members
Members of the Wisconsin State Assembly
20th-century American politicians